Charles [Auguste Louis] Panzéra  (February 16, 1896 in Geneva – June 6, 1976 in Paris) was a Swiss operatic and concert baritone.

Overview

Panzéra's studies at the Paris Conservatory under the tuition of Amédée-Louis Hettich were interrupted by his volunteering into the French Army during  World War I. Twice wounded, he was nevertheless able to complete the course and make his operatic début as Albert in Massenet's Werther at the Opéra-Comique in 1919. He remained there for three seasons, excelling in several rôles, notably Jahel in Lalo's Le roi d'Ys, Lescaut in Massenet's Manon and, most permanently, Debussy's Pelléas. He was to sing this part numerous times in several countries through 1930.

While still a student at the Conservatoire he had met both its then Director, Gabriel Fauré, who oriented him towards the interpretation of vocal chamber works, and a fellow student, pianist Magdeleine Baillot, who would become his wife and lifelong accompanist.

Fauré dedicated to Panzéra his song-cycle, L'horizon chimérique, composed in the autumn of 1921. The young baritone's creation of the new score at a concert of the Société Nationale de Musique, on 13 May 1922, was a resounding success and made Panzéra's name.

A marvelous lyric baritone, Panzéra's beautiful, warm and expressive instrument was perfectly at home in the subtle world of the art song. He became a world-renowned interpreter of the mélodie and the lied, touring extensively for nearly forty years. Besides Fauré, he worked personally with and sang the premières of works by Vincent d'Indy, Albert Roussel, Guy Ropartz, Arthur Honegger, Darius Milhaud and many others.

In 1949, he was appointed a professor at the Paris Conservatory, remaining till 1966. He also taught voice at the École Normale de Musique de Paris. Among his notable pupils were the composer Gabriel Cusson, the musicologist Alain Daniélou, the opera singer Pierre Mollet and the soprano Caroline Dumas.

Recordings

Following the triumphant première of L'horizon chimérique, Panzéra was immediately contacted by French HMV to make recordings. So many were the offers of engagements he received following that fateful 13 May 1922, that it was not until December 1923 that he and Magdeleine Panzéra-Baillot were able to set themselves up before the recording funnel of the as-yet acoustic gramophone to etch their first recording waxes. They continued registering a substantial repertory until the advent of war in 1940.

Besides a large selection of mélodies by Fauré, Duparc, Saint-Saëns, Caplet and many others, including German Lieder, Panzéra made a celebrated complete album of Schumann's Dichterliebe with Alfred Cortot at the piano in 1935.  He also recorded operatic music, not only the usual chestnuts of the French baritone, but items by Lully and other early composers, as well as J. S. Bach, Mozart, Beethoven and Wagner. He participated in the Berlioz La damnation de Faust complete recording (1934) and extended scenes from Pelléas et Mélisande (1927).

On compact disc

Many if not all of the above-noticed items have been reissued by EMI in Japan and France, as well as by Dante-Lys of France.  Pearl (Pavilion Records) has issued several invaluable volumes in excellent sound, including the Pelléas discs, which have also appeared through VAI in the USA.

Mercury

After the War, M. and Mme Panzéra made two LPs for Mercury, mostly of mélodies. These, unfortunately, were not chosen for re-mastering when many items of the Mercury catalogue were re-issued by Polygram in the 1990s. Both LPs, in their original format, have become great rarities.

Writings

He published L'Art de chanter (Paris, 1945); L'Amour de chanter, (Paris, 1957); L'Art vocal: 30 leçons de chant (Paris, 1959) and Votre voix: Directives génerales (Paris, 1967).

Bibliography

 Karl-Josef Kutsch and Leo Riemens, editors: Großes Sängerlexikon Basel, Saur, 2000
Song on Record : V. 1 (Lieder); V. 2 (Songs, including mélodies). Alan Blyth, editor  A history of Art Song and its interpretation, with a guide to available recordings  Cambridge, Cambridge University Press, 1986–1988

References

External links
Andrea’s subito - cantabile
 

1896 births
1976 deaths
Musicians from Geneva
Conservatoire de Paris alumni
Academic staff of the Conservatoire de Paris
20th-century Swiss male opera singers
French operatic baritones
20th-century French male opera singers